{{Infobox Election
| election_name      = 1948 Oregon gubernatorial special election
| country            = Oregon
| type               = presidential
| ongoing            = no
| previous_election  = 1946 Oregon gubernatorial election
| previous_year      = 1946
| next_election      = 1950 Oregon gubernatorial election
| next_year          = 1950
| election_date      = November 2, 1948
| image1             = 
| nominee1           = Douglas McKay
| party1             = Republican Party (United States)
| popular_vote1      = 271,295
| percentage1        = 53.2%
| image2             = 
| nominee2           = Lew Wallace
| party2             = Democratic Party (United States)
| popular_vote2      = 226,958
| percentage2        = 44.5%
| map_image          = 1948 Oregon gubernatorial special election results map by county.svg
| map_size           = 250px
| map_caption        = County results:McKay:   Wallace:  
| title              = Governor
| before_election    = John Hubert Hall
| before_party       = Republican Party (United States)
| after_election     = Douglas McKay
| after_party        = Republican Party (United States)
}}The 1948 Oregon gubernatorial special election''' took place on November 2, 1948 to elect the governor of the U.S. state of Oregon. A special election was needed due to the death of governor Earl Snell, who was killed in a plane crash on October 28, 1947.

Campaign
Incumbent governor John Hubert Hall, who took over after Snell's death until the election, lost the Republican nomination 51.13-48.87%, to state senator Douglas McKay, and the Democrats nominated state senator Lew Wallace, who had previously lost to Earl Snell in the 1942 gubernatorial election in a landslide.

In the general election, McKay won the election with 53.23% to Wallace's 44.53%, and was sworn in as Oregon's 25th governor on January 10, 1949.

Results

References

1948
Gubernatorial
Oregon
Gubernatorial 1948
Oregon 1948
November 1948 events in the United States